Two submarines of the United States Navy have been named USS Trout for the trout fish:
, a  submarine, was lost during World War II and is most famous for one mission which successfully transported 20 tons of gold and various other securities of the Philippine currency reserve to Pearl Harbor

United States Navy ship names